is a Japanese manga artist. Nakamura made her manga debut with Yume de Auyori Suteki in the manga magazine Hana to Yume in 1993.

Manga works
Blue Wars
Can't Give Up the MVP (MVP wa Yuzurenai)
Skip Beat! 『スキップ・ビート！』
Tokyo Crazy Paradise 『東京クレイジーパラダイス』
Yume de Au yori Suteki (Better Than Meeting In A Dream)
Saint Love (basketball series)
Dramatic Love Album (oneshot)

References

External links
 
 https://www.goodreads.com/author/show/164127.Yoshiki_Nakamura

Living people
1969 births
Manga artists from Tokushima Prefecture
Women manga artists
Female comics writers
20th-century Japanese women writers
21st-century Japanese women writers